Buddleja saligna, the false olive or bastard olive, is almost endemic to South Africa where it has a wide distribution. It occurs most often in ravines and against outcrops, and is distributed from coastal elevations to the central plateau at elevations of < 2000 m. The species was first described and named by Willdenow in 1809.

Description

Buddleja saligna is an evergreen shrub or small tree, growing < 15 m in height with a trunk diameter of 40 cm, and very similar to Salix and Olea.  The bark becomes longitudinally furrowed with age. The branchlets are quadrangular in section, and winged. The opposite, subcoriaceous narrowly elliptic to linear leaves vary considerably in size and shape, from 1.2 – 15 cm long by 0.2 – 3 cm wide. The upper surface of the leaf is medium to dark green, glabrous and smooth, while the underside is clothed in pale stellate hairs. The honey - scented flowers are cream or white, occasionally with a reddish orange throat, appearing as large terminal heads 12 cm × 12 cm in spring and summer; the corollas are 4 mm in length. The dense timber (specific gravity 0.98) is of exceptionally high quality, though rarely found in sizes suitable for furniture.

Cultivation
Buddleja saligna is hardy and frost resistant. In the UK, a specimen is grown as part of the NCCPG national collection held by Longstock Park Nursery, near Stockbridge, Hampshire. The shrub grows easily in well-drained soil, and is notably tolerant of drought. Hardiness: USDA zone 9.

References

 Palgrave, K. C. (1984). Trees of Southern Africa. 
 Van Wyk & van Wyk. (1997). Field Guide to the Trees of South Africa. 

saligna
Flora of South Africa
Trees of South Africa
Flora of Africa
Ornamental trees
Trees of Mediterranean climate